"Second Chance" is a song recorded by Faber Drive. It was released in February 2007 as the lead single from their debut album, Seven Second Surgery.

Music video
First attempt: A young man gets hit with a newspaper, on which "Groundhog Day Party" is written as the headline. At the last minute he remembers he has a date, but leaves the house without his wallet. He and his date get to the door of a club but as he doesn't have money to pay admission, his date is forced to pay for him. To make matters worse, people throw their food at her, and it ruins her dress. At the end of the night, he tries to kiss her, but she slaps him.

Second attempt: The man gets hit with the newspaper again, and proceeds to get dressed. This time he remembers to bring his wallet and pays for entry into the club. When he tries to put his arm around his date, she rejects it. Her dress still gets ruined by the people who threw food at them. They shake hands at the end of the date.

Third attempt: The man catches the newspaper and gets dressed faster and into nicer clothes than on his previous attempts. He also takes his wallet and an umbrella with him. Rather than trying to put his arm around his date, he keeps his hands to himself until she grabs his hand to get closer to him. When the food is thrown at the club, he uses his umbrella to block it and save her. When he takes her home at the end of the night, she pulls him into her house.

Charts

References

2007 debut singles
Faber Drive songs
Songs written by Chad Kroeger
Songs written by Brian Howes
2006 songs
Universal Records singles